Richard McNemar  (20 November 1770 – 15 September 1839) was a Presbyterian-turned-Shaker preacher, revivalist preacher, writer, and a historian of the early nineteenth century. He published the Shakers’ first printed bound book and is considered by historians as the father of Shaker literature. He started the Shaker colonies of Union Village Shaker settlement in Ohio and Shaker village of Pleasant Hill in Kentucky. He is the most prolific composer of Shaker hymns and anthems.

Early life 
McNemar was born 20 November 1770 at Tuscarora, Pennsylvania. He was the youngest of the McNemar children and had several brothers and sisters. According to family records and an existing poem by McNemar his family name means "Nobody's Son." There are several variations on the name, but the two prominent ones are "McNemar" and "McNamer". He is of Scotch-Irish descent that populated Pennsylvania.

The McNemar family moved when he was five years old to Huntingdon, Pennsylvania. They lived there for four years and then moved east about ten miles to a settlement on Shaner's Creek where they stayed for three years. The family moved again in the fall of 1783 south to the Kishacoqueller Valley. This was at the end of the Revolutionary War. McNemar worked on the family farm in the summers from 1783 and in the winters went to school. He was the last to leave the family, at the age of fifteen, since he was the youngest.

Mid life 
In 1786 he became a schoolteacher and was in charge of a school in Stone Valley, Pennsylvania. In 1787 during the summer he worked at odd jobs for an income. In the fall of 1787 he taught school at Redstone Township, Fayette County, Pennsylvania. In the fall of 1788 he taught school in Stone Valley and in the spring of 1789 he returned to Redstone to continue teaching. In the summer of 1789 McNemar went to Kentucky. He returned from there on the first day of January 1790 and began teaching at Ligonier, Pennsylvania in Westmoreland County, where he continued until April 1791. McNemar began teaching at New Salem, Pennsylvania, in May 1791. In October he traveled down the Ohio River and arrived in the beginning of November at Maysville, Kentucky.

Adulthood 

McNemar entered school and began to study Latin and theology in December 1791. He went to Cincinnati, Ohio, on 1 April 1792. He stayed in this city for three months and preached for the Presbyterian church. He delivered fifteen sermons in Cincinnati, Columbia, Round Bottom and Covalt's Station. Around the first of July in 1792 he returned to Elk Horn, Kentucky, where he continued his classical studies. McNemar moved to Cane Ridge, Kentucky, in December 1792 and lived with Robert Finley until May 1793. 
 
McNemar moved then and lived with John Luckes and stayed until the spring of 1795. He then moved to Madison County, Kentucky. He taught school there in the fall of 1796. Later in the year he returned to Cane Ridge and in January 1797 was licensed as a Presbyterian minister to preach. McNemar moved to Cabin Creek in the fall of 1797 and preached there at their church.

Kentucky Revival 

The Kentucky Revival was a religious revival. It happened in Kentucky, Ohio, Tennessee and parts of Vermont. It was a series of events of psychological phenomena that started around 1800. The spread of the revival in Kentucky began in Christian County and Logan County and in the Spring of 1801 had reached Mason County. The revival developed into the Cane Ridge Revival in August 1801 which drew several thousand people.

McNemar was preaching "free will" spirit and encouraged unrestrained physical activity in his church congregation around this same time. There were charges brought against him as this was not the normal custom of the Presbyterian church. McNemar officially dissolved his pastoral relation with the Presbyterian church at Cabin Creek in Lewis County, Kentucky, formally in the middle of April 1801. He went to a church in 1802 in Turtle Creek, that was near Lebanon, Ohio, where he preached part-time.

A petition was signed by sixty members of the Turtle Creek Church that asked for McNemar to preach full-time. The Turtle Creek Church was near Lebanon, Ohio. Jonathan Tichenor and others disapproved of McNemar being made full-time pastor of the church. McNemar and four other Presbyterian ministers, Robert Marshall, John Dunlevy, Barton W. Stone and John Thompson withdrew and formed an independent church – the New Light Church. This was the beginning in the "West" of the  "free will" movement. McNemar was a leader of the religious movement.

McNemar's New Light members split from the traditional Presbyterian customs and Calvinist theology. In time another separate faction called the schismatics broke away from the New Light members. They became even more physically expressive in their worship. McNemar's church sessions became exhortations on the order of the Holy Rollers. Church members had such shaking that their whole body vibrated. McNemar embraced this open excitement and claimed to his church members that it was spiritual inspiration. He interpreted New Light as an "inward light" that was above that of the Christian scriptures that the Presbyterians taught. Members of his new church could do unrestricted dancing by those that wished to do so, as it was fully tolerated and encouraged.

Shakerism 

There was so much excitement generated in the McNemar church congregation that it was anticipated Jesus was about to come. Actually what happen instead was that three Shaker missionaries came from the New Lebanon Shaker community in New York for a visit in 1805 traveling by foot for over a thousand miles. They were Issachar Bates, Benjamin S. Youngs and John Meacham. They were bringing Shakerism to the "West." The Shaker missionaries persuaded McNemar into their belief.

McNemar, who embraced Shakerism, influenced this belief more than any other person to the local congregations and is the reason for the existence of the Shaker societies in the "West" – Ohio and Kentucky. Eventually the New Light congregations that went for a little over a year and led by McNemar started the earliest Shaker colonies in the "West", Union Village Shaker settlement in Ohio and Shaker village of Pleasant Hill, Kentucky.

McNemar wrote at the Union Village Shaker settlement The Kentucky Revival, a Short History,  the Shakers first printed bound book. It gave details on this history of the Kentucky Revival that developed into Shakerism. It was printed in Cincinnati in 1807.

Personality 
McNemar was tall and thin and had an outgoing personality. He read Latin, Greek and Hebrew. He was known as a classical scholar. He is considered by historians as the father of Shaker literature. McNemar became known as the "Father of Shaker music" and is the most prolific composer of Shaker hymns and anthems.

Family 
McNemar was married to Jane "Jennie" Luckey on 8 April 1793 in Bourbon County, Kentucky. Their children were: Levi, Benjamin, James, Vincy, Elisha, and Nancy McNemar.

Death 
McNemar died 15 September 1839.

Notes

References

External links 
  The Kentucky Revival

1770 births
1839 deaths
People from Schuylkill County, Pennsylvania
Writers from Pennsylvania
American Shaker missionaries
19th-century Presbyterian ministers
18th-century Presbyterian ministers
People from Huntingdon, Pennsylvania
People from Fayette County, Pennsylvania
People from Westmoreland County, Pennsylvania
People from Maysville, Kentucky
People from New Salem, Pennsylvania
People from Taylor County, Kentucky
Religious leaders from Cincinnati
People from Bourbon County, Kentucky
People from Madison County, Kentucky
American Christian writers
People from Turtlecreek Township, Ohio
People from Mercer County, Kentucky
People from Busseron Township, Indiana